CrypTool is an open-source project
that is a free e-learning software for illustrating cryptographic and cryptanalytic concepts.
According to "Hakin9", CrypTool is worldwide the most widespread e-learning software in the field of cryptology.

CrypTool implements more than 400 algorithms. Users can adjust these with own parameters. To introduce users to the field of cryptography, the organization created multiple graphical interface software containing an online documentation, analytic tools and algorithms. They contain most classical ciphers, as well as modern symmetric and asymmetric cryptography including RSA, ECC, digital signatures, hybrid encryption, homomorphic encryption, and Diffie–Hellman key exchange. Methods from the area of quantum cryptography (like BB84 key exchange protocol) and the area of post-quantum cryptography (like McEliece, WOTS, Merkle-Signature-Scheme, XMSS, XMSS_MT, and SPHINCS) are implemented. In addition to the algorithms, solvers (analyzers) are included, especially for classical ciphers. Other methods (for instance Huffman code, AES, Keccak, MSS) are visualized.

In addition it contains: didactical games (like Number Shark, Divider Game, or Zudo-Ku) and interactive tutorials about primes, elementary number theory, and lattice-based cryptography.

Development, history and roadmap 
The development of CrypTool started in 1998. Originally developed by German companies and universities, it is an open-source project since 2001. More than sixty people worldwide contribute regularly to the project. Contributions as software plugins came from universities or schools in the following towns: Belgrad, Berlin, Bochum, Brisbane, Darmstadt, Dubai, Duisburg-Essen, Eindhoven, Hagenberg, Jena, Kassel, Klagenfurth, Koblenz, London, Madrid, Mannheim, San Jose, Siegen, Utrecht, Warsaw.

Currently 4 versions of CrypTool are maintained and developed: The CrypTool 1 (CT1) software is available in 6 languages (English, German, Polish, Spanish, Serbian, and French). CrypTool 2 (CT2) is available in 3 languages (English, German, Russian). All others, JCrypTool (JCT) and CrypTool-Online (CTO), are available only in English and German.

The goal of the CrypTool project is to make users aware of how cryptography can help against network security threats and to explain the underlying concepts of cryptology.

CrypTool 1 (CT1) is written in C++ and designed for the Microsoft Windows operating system. A port of CT1 to Linux with Qt4 was started, but there is no progress anymore.

In 2007, development began on two additional projects, both based on a pure-plugin architecture, to serve as successors to the original CrypTool program. Both successors regularly publish new stable versions:

 CrypTool 2 (built with C#/.NET/WPF) (abbreviated CT2)
uses the concept of visual programming to clarify cryptographic processes. Currently, CT2 contains more than 150 crypto functions.

 JCrypTool 1.0 (built with Java/Eclipse/RCP/SWT) (abbreviated JCT)
runs on Windows, macOS, and Linux, and offers both a document-centric and a function-centric perspective. Currently, JCT contains more than 100 crypto functions. One of its focal points are modern digital signatures (like Merkle trees and SPHINCS).

Awards
CrypTool has received several international awards as an educational program, such as the TeleTrusT Special Award 2004, EISA 2004, IT Security Award NRW 2004, and Selected Landmark in the Land of Ideas 2008 award.

Use
CrypTool is used in schools, universities, companies and agencies for education and awareness training.

Worldwide, the CrypTool packages are downloaded more than 10,000 times per month from the CrypTool website. Just over 50% of the downloads are for the English version.

CrypTool-Online (abbreviated CTO)
The CrypTool project also includes the website CrypTool-Online, launched in 2009. This website allows users to try cryptographic methods directly within a browser on a PC or on a smartphone (using JavaScript), without the need to download and install software. 
This site aims to present the topic in an easy and attractive way for new users and young people.  Advanced tasks still require the offline versions of CrypTool.

MysteryTwister (MTC3) 
In 2010, the international cipher contest MTC3 started as part of the CrypTool project.
The contest currently offers more than 200 challenges derived from old and modern ciphers and designed by more than 30 different authors from different countries.  All challenges are presented in PDF templates in English and German. The challenges are clustered in four levels of difficulty, which range from simple riddles solvable with paper-and-pencil to mathematical challenges from modern cryptanalysis for researchers and experts. Additionally, a moderated forum, user statistics, and a hall-of-fame are available.  Currently, more than 10,000 registered users are engaged in solving these challenges.

Merger with CrypTools 
In early 2020, the CrypTool project decided to merge with a similar project of the same name, CrypTools, founded in 2017 in Australia by Luka Lafaye de Micheaux, Arthur Guiot, and Lucas Gruwez. CrypTool, much older and known, thus completely "absorbs" the project under its name.

The first impact of this merger is the rebranding of the project. A new logo, a new website, and the new CTO version are announced. Currently, it's still in development. Another change was the targeted audience. Previously, CrypTool focused on (university) students, and CrypTools on developers and young people. It was therefore necessary to broaden the audience.

On May 15, 2020, in the midst of the COVID-19 pandemic, CrypTool announces the creation of tools to test Decentralized contact tracing protocols. A new page is added to CTO with technical description of the algorithms involved in DP-3T and Exposure Notification. In addition to this, CrypTool also announced the implementation of a page dedicated to raising awareness of the cryptographic means related to privacy in these protocols, called the Corona Tracing Animation. The newer page stands out for its new design and its accessibility to ordinary users.

See also

Asymmetric key algorithm
Topics in cryptography
Cryptosystem

References

External links 
 
 CrypTool-Online
 International Cipher Contest "MysteryTwister" (MTC3)
 Presentation about the CrypTool-1 program with more than 100 slides and many screenshots

1998 software
Free educational software
Cryptographic software
Free software programmed in C++
Free software programmed in Java (programming language)
Free software programmed in C Sharp
Windows-only free software
Cryptography contests